, also known as Space Wolf Juspion, is a Japanese tokusatsu television series and part of the Metal Hero Series franchise. Produced by Toei Company, it was originally broadcast from 15 March 1985 to 24 March 1986, running for 46 episodes. The name "Juspion" is a portmanteau of "Justice" and "Champion". The series was aired in Brazil under the name "O Fantástico Jaspion" in 1988 and enjoyed unprecedented success in that country, eventually paving the way for other tokusatsu television series in Brazilian television. Juspion was aired in the Philippines on GMA Network in 1988.

For distribution purposes, Toei refers to this television series as Jaspion.

In February 2018, it was announced that Juspion would get a remake movie produced by Brazilian company Sato Company, with Toei's endorsement and approval. The movie's cast was expected to be announced in 2019, with the film set initially to be released in the early 2020s.

in 2020, the Brazilian publisher JBC launched a comic book in manga-style titled O Regresso de Jaspion (The Return of Jaspion), with the approval of Toei. The story follows the end of the TV show.

Plot
While reading the Galactic Bible, the space hermit Eijin learns of a shocking prophecy: When the dark god Satan Goth awakens, the universe will be ravaged by giant monsters filled with rage. After Satan Goth appears and the prophecy is set in motion, Eijin orders Juspion, who Eijin has been tutoring, to stop him and combat the corrupted MegaBeasts. Juspion travels with his friends Anri the android and Miya the alien across the galaxy in his battleship Daileon to confront Satan Goth and his army. Eventually, Juspion land on Earth, which, it turns out, is a prolific source of MegaBeasts (it's explained that the dinosaurs were part of that group), and many of them are still asleep in various locations.

Amongst Juspion's arsenal, there is his Metal Tech Suit armor, made of a very rare mineral called Ejinium and equipped with a visor called Sensor Eye that can scan the environment with x-ray and night vision, and his Plasma Blazer Sword, which can be contracted for storage and can be infused with the plasma during combat, and his Beam Scanner Gun. His warship Daileon also houses the Super Planetary Combat Tank Garbin, which doubles as the Garbin Jet, and a motorcycle vehicle called Super Planetary Machine Iron Wolf. Daileon itself can transform into a giant robot called Super Planetary Battle Giant Daileon. Daileon is frequently Juspion's final and most devastating tool to be used against MegaBeasts.

Characters

Daileon crew
Based from the silver , Juspion travels across worlds to pursue Satan Goth.

   The main hero of the series, Juspion is an orphan raised by Eijin, until he embarks on his quest to fight the MegaBeasts and defeat Satan Goth. Juspion travels between planets to stop Satan Goth until he arrives on Earth. His Metal-Tech suit is made from the very rare galactic mineral Ejinium and grants superhuman capabilities to its owner.
   An android created by Eijin, she is Juspion's companion in his journey. Being a machine, Anri is immune to evil powers.
   A baby alien creature found by Juspion and Anri on planet Beezee when her parents were killed saving them from the native hunters. Soon after, Juspion adopts Miya as a  pet. She is very friendly, intelligent, sociable and an excellent cook. She originally doesn't speak, sometimes only repeating her name, until Anri teaches her to speak properly beginning in episode 22.

Vehicles
    Juspion's silver motorcycle.
   Juspion's silver tank, which splits into the Garbin Tank with twin drills and the Garbin Jet.

Allies
   A space hermit and scientist, Eijin is the descendant of prophets who defended the Galactic Bible for millennia. While raising Juspion, he serves as Juspion's spiritual guide and mentor. He sacrifices his own life at the end of the series by confronting Satan Goth alone to give Juspion the time he needed to find the "Galactic Tarzan".
  (6-10, 12, 31 and 32) After his older brother, an Interpol investigator, was killed by Satan Goth's forces, this medical student vowed revenge and became an International US Marshal, fighting with his twin boomerangs.
 The Nanbara Family (15-20, 22, 24; 25-27, 35-40 42, 44-46)  Photographer , his older daughter  and his younger son  became closely linked with Juspion when Kenichirou took a photo of the Golden Bird. It turned out that Kanoko was one of the five children chosen by the Golden Bird to house its power until the time comes.
  (18)  Juspion's biological parents, they worked for the health of animals across the galaxy. Gary was an animal caretaker for the Galactic Federation while Anna was a zoologist. They were both killed when their wrecked spaceship, attacked by Zanba, fell on Eijin's Planet. They both reappeared as spirits to help Juspion defeat Zanba.
   The guardian phoenix god of the galaxy, a manifestation of the energies of righteousness. The bird scattered itself into seven lights that choose Juspion, Kanoko, along with four other children, and a baby born from the light to serve as its vessels until all seven are brought together so that Golden Bird can leave their bodies and become whole again for the final battle with Satan Goth, turning itself into a  used by Daileon to slay Super Satan Goth.
  (46)  A baby mentioned in a prophecy in the Galactic Bible born from one of the seven lights of the Golden Bird, he landed on Earth, sleeping in a life support pod, as the sole survivor of a spaceship attacked by pirates. Juspion saw himself in the baby and named him Tarzan, adopting the child after Super Satan Goth's defeat.

MegaBeast Empire
   A being born of the negative energy of the cosmos, the great god-demon whose revival was foretold in the Galactic Bible with the power to enrage the creatures, turning them in vicious monsters. Satan Goth's objective is to create a MegaBeast Empire in the galaxy and rule it from the Planet of the MegaBeasts. Originally a giant pupil stage resembling a cross between Darth Vader and Megatron, in the endgame arc, Satan Goth reaches the peak of his power and molts to become , possessing a Cthulhu-like appearance and the power to bend nature to his will, turning cities into forests overnight. He was defeated by the  attack  where Daileon brandished a Golden Sword created by the Golden Bird in the final episode.
  (4-45)  The son of Satan Goth and his heir to the MegaBeast Empire. Juspion's antagonist throughout the series, he is capable of fighting him with his sword (similar to Juspion's) and with his black VTOL 6-legged insectoid walker/plane. He wears a reminiscent black Metal-Tech suit similar to Juspion's and can take on human form. Mad Gallant is destroyed once by Juspion in the episode 29, but is soon resurrected by Gilza; in the penultimate episode of the series he has a climatic final battle with Juspion. After being badly injured by Juspion in this battle and furious by refusing to admit that a "mere human" could be stronger than a super life-form, he turns himself into a giant Satan Goth for a few moments, similar to his father's first form, and tries to attack the hero, but due to being previously wounded he returns to his original form and dies right after.
  (10)  Two revived Amazon women created under Mad Gallant's rule in order to locate the long-extinct Pirazar and revive it as a weapon against Juspion.
   The hirelings of Mad Gallant.
  (13-15)  The top-ranking ruthless bodyguard in the galaxy. Born in a planet located at the other extreme of the galaxy, he was the first enemy in the entire series to be killed via Juspion's fatal attack Cosmic Halley. His main weapon was a trident who could blow fire from its bottom tip, and he could also fire his own clenched fists like jet-propelled explosive projectiles.
  (13-18)  Evil android who wrongly blamed Gary and Anna for mobilizing the Galactic Federation against him and destroying his Machine Empire. As revenge, Zanba attacked Juspion's family's spaceship, forcing a disastrous crash land which killed them both, leaving only Juspion to survive. His main weapon was a kusarigama, and he transformed into his android form with superior strength and endurance, and ability to fire concussive lasers from his eyes, but even so Juspion managed to destroy him, thus avenging his deceased family.
Brima is a dark prophet with white clothing and a ball-shaped helmet, her main weapons were a crystal ball and occasional magic daggers; Gyol is a spy and disguise master clad in basic red and black space armor, her main weapon was a combination of spear/flute/blowgun, not only could she shoot the blade on the end forward to explode against Juspion, but she could also play a tune on it to transform herself and others into different forms (such as disguising herself into a bird to spy on others, or to turn other people into animals to get this one boy to use his skills to draw Juspion being defeated). She could also use the flute to control others' minds but as a result of Juspion's power armor he was immune to her flute, however she could cause him to suffer vertigo so as to teleport herself and others to safety. In their final appearance their weapons were destroyed by Juspion, resulting in them magically combining themselves into a wolf-beast form to attack Juspion, who defeated the beast with his Cosmic Halley fatal attack, killing both.
  (19)  A sea coral-shielded seal-faced undead samurai warrior who lived deep in the sea since his imprisonment 900 years ago - in a flashback explaining that time, under his real name Tokifusa Unno, Zamurai planned to kill respected general Minamoto no Yoritomo for the Heikei in exchange for a huge reward, but he was defeated by Minamoto and was imprisoned in the sea, bringing forth his current story; back to present day, he and Mad Gallant worked on a plan to create dolphin missile-launchers to destroy submarines and battleships around the world in exchange for control over the MegaBeast Empire's dolphin farm. Zamurai fights with a spear and hidden swords, and was practically immortal thanks to leeching off of his MegaBeast Seablur's lifeforce.
  (20)  A mariachi-looking space murderer (with his own Mexican-sounding background music). He lured Juspion into a cave to study all of the hero's weapons and powers in order to kill and entomb him forever. Girarist was the only villain in the whole series not to die at Juspion's hands (it is even uncertain if Girarist is really dead after the cave collapsed on him).
  (22)  Brima's teacher of dark arts, she placed a curse on Kanoko to try to discover where the Golden Bird is. She had many supernatural abilities, including powers of illusion and shooting spider webs from her hands to entangle Juspion. She also used her pet giant Spida to attack Juspion, aiding it by using her illusions to make impossible for any enemy to detect her true location. Juspion later discovered that Spida was an illusion made by Chikita and fired his Daileon Beam at it.
   Space mercenary brothers who pillaged and destroyed several planets (amidst them Koko's planet Dodo).  (25) is first terminated by Juspion; in a devilish attempt to avenge his brother,  (25-26) (along with MegaBeast Boga) tackles the hero and gets destroyed as well.
They were in charge of kidnapping young people and turning them into bestial creatures under Mad Gallant's control by draining their essence . Their true form is the Cerberus-like .
  (28)  An android with a western face who extensively studied Juspion's and Daileon's attributes in order to predict their attacks. He and his MegaBeast AI-GER could only be defeated when Juspion performed a new fighting move unknown to AI-GER Man, causing the latter's downfall.
  (29-36)  An alien witch who was responsible of bringing Mad Gallant back to life when he was first defeated in battle by Juspion. Gilza is precisely an expert in curses and general dark arts. Gilza had successfully removed Juspion's soul with a potion but it was returned to him shortly after. She had with her an enchanted knife that was her focus in battle and used it to try to remove Juspion's soul during the last fight. Her knife was the only thing which could harm her and Juspion used it to weaken her and finally defeat Gilza with the Cosmic Halley attack.
They allied Mad Gallant in a double, menacing plan of kidnapping several children and demanding a ransom in form of gold bars stolen from the Japan National Bank. This plan, however, was just to divert Juspion and US Marshal Boomerang's attention while Mad Gallant worked on his plan: to sink Japan's islands into the ocean by nuking them with small nuclear warheads. Silk is perhaps the only human in the entire series to be defeated by Juspion's Cosmic Halley attack, perishing along with his two bodyguards.
  (32)  An old alien scientist from Planet L who sells Helper Robots on Earth that are really lethal weapons working for Satan Goth to rig bombs to people's appliances.
  (37)  a reptilian-looking alien specializing in culinary arts, he created an evil duplicate of Miya in order to lure Juspion into a devious trap involving poisoned food. Braggle can fire small powerful energy orbs and fights with a rapier.
  (39-46)  The "Specter Queen" of the Dark Galaxy and Gilza's elder sister, debuting shortly after Gilza's death. In order to receive some of Satan Goth's evil power, Gilmaza infiltrated several planets across the universe and slowly caused the extinctions of these civilizations through futile strategies - such as, in Planet Zabos, by prophesizing the youth to the Church of Satan Goth, corrupting them and causing the planet to spiral into crime; or, in Planet Sweet, by cleverly manipulating the leaders of East and West, leading them ultimately to nuclear war disguised as a sorceress. She died with Mad Gallant's foot soldiers, after Satan Goth was killed and the energy he released vaporized them all. She has her Space Ninjas as her top soldiers.
   Gilmaza's top soldiers created through her black magic, they wear suits of black armor differing only in the color of their forehead plates (which name them after the element they represent, in a conception taken directly from Taoism). They all have two "default attacks" (a plasmic projectile with the same color of their forehead plates and a kind of "plasma sword", both channeled via their hands) and one peculiar fighting "special technique" (except for Water). They only revealed their true forms after having their heads split open by Juspion's Plasma Blazer Sword.
  (39-43)  Apparently the group's leader. His "special technique" consists on him jumping above a jet of fire and then rushing into the enemy, strongly hitting him with an explosion; his true form is of a meteor/comet, referred to as the Fire Magma Shell, which fuels the Wind Cannon.
  (39-43)  His "special technique" is similar to Fire's but using wind instead of fire; his true form is of a cannon which springs out of his neck, referred to as the Wind Cannon, fueled by Fire Magma Shell.
  (39)  His "special technique" has him burrowing deep into the earth to provoke massive earthquakes or ambush careless enemies; his true form is of a flying skeletal centipede-like demon that has powerful jaws, can project plasma discharges and create a holographic illusion of itself with double size, thus increasing attack power.
  (39 and 40)  Unlike the other four ninjas, he never exhibited any "special technique" of his own, thus being limited to default attacks; his true form is of a kind of spiked satellite/steel orb which shoots powerful electric discharges and sticks physically into any surface to drain energy through physical contact.
  (39-42)  His "special technique" allows him to fire green gravity beams from his fingertips; his true form is of a space fighter wearing white clothing with a horrible demonic mask and fighting with a naginata, in similarity with a kabuki artist.
  (41)  A bounty hunter whose reputation reached the Dark Galaxy that was brainwashed by Gilmaza to kill his best friend Juspion.
 The MegaBeast Empire also is shown to have a rather diverse troop of unnamed foot soldiers.

MegaBeasts
  This monster appeared in episode 1. Its powers include asexual reproduction, mouth energy balls, and mouth flames.
  This monster appeared in episode 1. Its powers include flight and talons.
  This monster appeared in episode 2. Its powers include burrowing, freezing mist from the mouth, eye energy blasts, and a whip tail.
  This monster appeared in episodes 3 and 25. Its powers include mouth flames and a forehead horn. It is the only MegaBeast to appear in multiple episodes.
  This monster appeared in episode 4. Its powers include swimming, burrowing, mouth flames, a launchable back shell with extendable spikes, and explosive mouth mist.
Unnamed MegaBeast  This unnamed MegaBeast appeared in episode 5. Its powers include dimensional traveling, a fanged trunk, and twin tusks.
  This monster appeared in episode 6. Its parent can burrow, shoot mouth flames, and shoot body sparks that grant flight.
  This monster appeared in episode 7. Its powers include internal tentacles, a rock body, and mouth mist.
  This monster appeared in episode 8. Its powers include absorbing smaller lifeforms and twin head horns.
  This monster appeared in episode 9, created from a lone Tree Spirit. Its powers include flight, intense cedar pollen from the mouth, burrowing by spinning, ensnaring roots, and explosive mouth spears.
  This monster appeared in episode 10, created from the fossil of the long extinct Pirazar. Its powers include swimming, pressurized water from the top mouth, and reinforced scales.
  This monster appeared in episode 11. Its powers include life-enhancing body oil that will also turn the subject berserk, burrowing, a long tongue, mouth flames, and teleportation.
  This monster appeared in episode 13, created from a page of a child's comic book when blown onto a stone slab. Its powers include size changing, shape-shifting via sight, sand reducing touch, and teleportation.
  This monster appeared in episode 14. Its powers include swimming, a high resistance to heat, a long tail for whipping and coiling, and turn fire into his own energy.
  This monster appeared in episode 15. Its powers include burrowing and explosive mouth mist.
  This monster appears in episode 16. Its powers include extendable arms that read/wipe minds, antennae energy bolts, and holograms.
  This monster appeared in episode 17. Its powers include invisibility, mouth suction, internal tentacles, burrowing, a detachable head on the tail, and holograms.
  This monster appeared in episode 19. Its powers include swimming, a howitzer cannon on each shoulder, and an anchor.
  This monster appeared in episode 20. Its powers include mouth flames and a pair of Kama.
  This monster appeared in episode 21. Its powers include electromagnetic hurricanes and a falcata.
  This monster appeared in episode 22. Its powers include levitation, teleportation, mouth webs, spear legs, explosive eye flashes, and illusions, itself being an illusion created by Chikita.
  This monster appeared in episode 23. Its powers include high jumping, reinforced teeth, and mouth flames. Since it was a tamed MegaBeast, Juspion had to unwillingly kill it in a very heart-breaking scene due to Satan Goth's deep possession.
  This monster appeared in episode 24. Its powers include eye electric bolts, burrowing, an extendable tongue, and arm whips.
  This monster appeared in episode 25. Its powers include burrowing, pincer claw hands, psychic explosions, head mandibles that emit energy surges, and tail energy blasts.
  This monster appeared in episode 26. Its powers include an extendable energy draining trunk and nose flames.
  This monster appeared in episode 27. Its powers include burrowing, mouth mist, and creating illusions.
  This robotic monster appeared in episode 28. Its powers include the Go-Boomerang saw for the right arm, burrowing, a torso drill, and replacing his left hand with a hammer or wrecking ball.
  This monster appeared in episode 29. Its powers include explosive toxic gas from body and mouth tubes and burrowing.
  This monster appeared in episode 30. Its powers include flight, spawning balloon lifeforms, and a balled tail that emits explosive sparks.
  This monster appeared in episode 31 that was also a time bomb. Its powers include swimming, depth charges from the mouth, and fast burrowing.
  This monster appeared in episode 33. Its powers include a red electrical shield, illusionary MegaBeasts that emit electric shocks, and mouth flames.
  This robotic monster appeared in episode 34. Its powers include a head cannon and a missile on each foot. Later appears rebuilt in episode 42. Its powers now include four wrecking balls in the top, and a drill in the head in addition to the head cannon from its original form.
  This monster appeared in episode 36. Its powers include fast burrowing and sharp claws.
  This monster appeared in episode 37. Its powers include a right hand claw, and a left hand fork.
"Miya's MegaBeast Form"  Really Prawnzole in disguise with Brima's help as part of Mad Gallant's plan to destroy Juspion. Its powers include high jumping, reinforced teeth, and mouth flames.
  This monster appeared in episode 38. Its only known power is burrowing.
''  This monster appeared in episode 40. Its powers include creating fake diamonds from the skin, burrowing, and tail lasers.
  This monster appeared in episode 41. Its powers include burrowing, tentacle hair, a knife for each hand, and eye energy bolts.
  This monster appeared in episode 44. Its powers include a mouth machine gun and mouth flames. It is the only MegaBeast destroyed by the  attack, as he was unable to call for Daileon in a Super Satan Goth Zone.

Episodes
On January 6, 1986 (The day that episode 35 aired) the show later aired on Mondays instead of Fridays.
 : written by Shozo Uehara, directed by Yoshiaki Kobayashi
 : written by Shozo Uehara, directed by Yoshiaki Kobayashi
 : written by Shozo Uehara, directed by Takeshi Ogasawara
 : written by Shozo Uehara, directed by Takeshi Ogasawara
 : written by Shozo Uehara, directed by Michio Konishi
 : written by Shozo Uehara, directed by Michio Konishi
 : written by Shozo Uehara, directed by Takeshi Ogasawara
 : written by Shozo Uehara, directed by Takeshi Ogasawara
 : written by Shozo Uehara, directed by Makoto Tsuji
 : written by Shozo Uehara, directed by Makoto Tsuji
 : written by Shozo Uehara, directed by Takeshi Ogasawara
 : written by Shozo Uehara, directed by Takeshi Ogasawara
 : written by Shozo Uehara, directed by Michio Konishi
 : written by Shozo Uehara, directed by Michio Konishi
 : written by Shozo Uehara, directed by Takeshi Ogasawara
 : written by Shozo Uehara, directed by Takeshi Ogasawara
 : written by Shozo Uehara, directed by Michio Konishi
 : written by Shozo Uehara, directed by Michio Konishi
 : written by Shozo Uehara, directed by Takeshi Ogasawara
 : written by Haruya Yamazaki, directed by Takeshi Ogasawara
 : written by Shozo Uehara, directed by Michio Konishi
 : written by Shozo Uehara, directed by Michio Konishi
 : written by Haruya Yamazaki, directed by Makoto Tsuji
 : written by Shozo Uehara, directed by Makoto Tsuji
 : written by Shozo Uehara, directed by Takeshi Ogasawara
 : written by Shozo Uehara, directed by Takeshi Ogasawara
 : written by Shozo Uehara, directed by Michio Konishi
 : written by Shozo Uehara, directed by Michio Konishi
 : written by Shozo Uehara, directed by Takeshi Ogasawara
 : written by Shozo Uehara, directed by Takeshi Ogasawara
 : written by Shozo Uehara, directed by Michio Konishi
 : written by Shozo Uehara, directed by Michio Konishi
 : written by Shozo Uehara, directed by Takeshi Ogasawara
 : written by Shozo Uehara, directed by Takeshi Ogasawara
 : written by Shozo Uehara, directed by Makoto Tsuji
 : written by Shozo Uehara, directed by Makoto Tsuji
 : written by Haruya Yamazaki, directed by Michio Konishi
 : written by Shozo Uehara, directed by Michio Konishi
 : written by Shozo Uehara, directed by Shohei Tojo
 : written by Shozo Uehara, directed by Shohei Tojo
 : written by Haruya Yamazaki, directed by Takeshi Ogasawara
 : written by Shozo Uehara, directed by Takeshi Ogasawara
 : written by Shozo Uehara, directed by Shohei Tojo
 : written by Shozo Uehara, directed by Shohei Tojo
 : written by Shozo Uehara, directed by Takeshi Ogasawara
 : written by Shozo Uehara, directed by Takeshi Ogasawara

Cast
Juspion  Hikaru Kurosaki
Anri  Kiyomi Tsukada
Miya  Atsuko Koganezawa
Eijin  Noboru Nakaya
Boomerang  Hiroshi Watari
Kenichirou Nanbara  Isao Sasaki
Kanoko Nanbara  Kiyomi Sone
Kenta Nanbara  Daisuke Yamashita
Kumiko  Miki Takahashi
Lott  Hiroshi Satō
Sachi  Yoshie Hayashi
Satan Goth  Shōzō Iizuka (voice)
Mad Gallant  Jyunichi Haruta
Brima  Misa Nirei
Gyol  Kei Anan
Zanba  Daigaku Sekine
Ikki  Toshimichi Takahashi
Gasami the Elder  Eiichi Kikuchi
Gasami the Younger  Shun Ueda
Gilza  Atsuko Takahata
Gilmaza  Yukie Kagawa
Narrator  Tōru Ōhira

Songs
Opening theme

Lyrics  Keisuke Yamakawa
Composition and Arrangement  Michiaki Watanabe
Artist  
Ending theme

Lyrics  Keisuke Yamakawa
Composition and Arrangement  Michiaki Watanabe
Artist  Ai Takano

Video releases and internet streaming 
The official Toei video releases in the '80s listed in English, below the title, "Space Wolf Juspion" (named after the ending theme for instance). This has created some confusion and has led some to believe that is the actual title of the series and translation of "Kyojuu Tokusou." The Space Wolf name is simply one of Juspion's nicknames much like the "Galactic Tarzan" in order for him to have a title to introduce himself by. During
Otakon 2018, Discotek Media announced that they had licensed the show for a one-disc SD on BD release. The SD Blu-ray was released on August 27, 2019.
In 2021, the complete series was streaming on Crunchyroll, making the first tokusatsu from Toei to be streaming on the service. Episodes of the show has since been added to YouTube's Toei Tokusatsu World Official channel as well.

References

External links

Japanese fantasy television series
Extraterrestrial superheroes
Discotek Media
Fictional soldiers
Space marines
Tokusatsu television series
Japanese action television series
Metal Hero Series
1985 Japanese television series debuts
1986 Japanese television series endings
TV Asahi original programming